Islam is a minority religion within the Democratic Republic of the Congo, where the large majority of the population is affiliated with various Christian denominations and sects. It was first introduced to the Congo basin from the East African coast during the Arab slave trade in the 19th century and remains largely concentrated in parts of Eastern Congo, notably in Maniema Province. Most Congolese Muslims are Sunni and follow the Shafi‘i and Maliki school of jurisprudence (fiqh). Though estimates vary, it is generally believed that between one and 10 percent of the country's population identify as Muslim.

Religion

History
Islam was spread to the Congo in the 18th or 19th century by Afro-Arab traders, such as Tippo Tip or Rumaliza, from the East African coast as part of the Arab slave trade which increasingly drew coastal traders into the interior in search of slaves and ivory. Although the Arabs did not expressly intend to spread their religion or culture, many African peoples adopted the ideas they brought and the Swahili language was often associated with them. With the expansion of European colonial rule into the eastern Congo under the auspices of the Congo Free State, European colonists came into conflict and defeated the Arabs, largely ending this process. Under Belgian colonial rule (1908–60), Muslims were distrusted and considered a potential source of sedition and Christianity, especially Catholicism, was promoted by the state. The religion suffered repression during this period. The arrival of the Qadiriyya, a branch of Sufism, from Tanganyika in the 1920s was particularly repressed by the colonial government. 

The independence of the Congo in 1960 brought greater religious tolerance and allowed the Muslim community to organise publicly for the first time. Muslim communities received foreign support, notably from Muammar Gaddafi in the 1990s whose regime in Libya financed the construction of mosques in Eastern Congo. Since the end of the Second Congo War, the Congo's Muslim community has been increasingly united with the emergence of a national leadership.

Today

Today, Islam is a major religion within the Democratic Republic of the Congo. It is particularly prominent in the east of the country where it has been present since the 18th century. The highest concentration of Muslims is in Maniema Province and especially its cities of Kasongo and Kindu where they represent 80–90 percent and 25 percent of the population respectively. Besides indigenous Muslims, the population also includes recent immigrants from Lebanon, India, Pakistan and other parts of the African continent.

Congolese Muslims are represented at a national level by the Islamic Community of the Democratic Republic of the Congo (Communauté islamique du République démocratique du Congo, or Comico) which succeeded the Islamic Community of Zaire (Communauté islamique du Zaïre, Comiza) founded in the 1970s. However, the religion has little political influence in national politics and are underrepresented in its institutions. In the 2006 general elections, just four Muslims deputies and three senators were elected out of 500 and 108 respectively.

The vast majority of Muslims in the country identify themselves as Sunni, following the Maliki school of jurisprudence (fiqh). 10 percent are Shia and six percent are Ahmadi. Congolese Muslims are frequently divided between conservative Sufis and Reformists (Salafists) as well as along local ethnic, geographical, and generational lines.

Violence between Muslims and other religious groups in the Congo, especially Congolese Christians, has been attested in North Kivu since 2014 in connection with the Allied Democratic Forces insurgency which originated in neighbouring Uganda. The Allied Democratic Forces, whose political ideology is based on Islamism, is widely suspected of having perpetrated the Beni massacre in August 2016. It was reported in 2019 that the Pakistani contingent of the United Nations MONUSCO force was reported to have financed the construction of new mosques in the region, contributing to an "islamisation" of Eastern Congo.

Numbers
Recent estimates of the proportion of the Congolese population who self-identify as Muslim vary considerably and range between approximately one and 10 percent.  According to the political scientist Ashley E. Leinweber, it is generally estimated that around 10 percent of the national population identifies as Muslim. In 2012, the Pew Research Center estimated the figure at 12 percent. However, another Pew estimate in 2007 put the figure at just 1.4 percent. An estimate by the US Department of State put the figure at 5% in 2015, and the CIA World Factbook at 1.3%.

Notable people

See also
Islam in Africa
Religion in the Democratic Republic of the Congo
Christianity in the Democratic Republic of the Congo

Notes

Bibliography

Further reading

External links

Religion in the Democratic Republic of the Congo
Congo, Democratic Republic